The Slayton Farms-Round Barn is a historic building located near Iowa Falls in rural Hardin County, Iowa, United States. Frank Slayton had it built in 1915 for use as a dairy barn. The barn is one of 16 that was built by the Johnston Brothers Clay Works from Fort Dodge, Iowa. It is constructed of hollow clay tiles and features a gambrel roof with two different pitches and hay dormer. Two aerators flank the central silo on the roof. The interior of the barn is fashioned around the silo from which silage was shoveled to feed the cattle. An overhead track system and a bucket for hauling materials remains intact. It has been listed on the National Register of Historic Places since 1999.

References

Infrastructure completed in 1915
Buildings and structures in Hardin County, Iowa
National Register of Historic Places in Hardin County, Iowa
Barns on the National Register of Historic Places in Iowa
Round barns in Iowa